Fay-aux-Loges is a commune the Loiret department in Centre-Val de Loire region in north-central France and about  southwest of Paris.

Geography
Fay-aux-Loges is located in the septentrional bend of the Loire, which crosses from it east to west.  Fay-aux-Loges belongs to the vallée de la Loire sector between Sully-sur-Loire and Chalonnes-sur-Loire, which was in 2000 inscribed by UNESCO as a World Heritage Site.  The capital of Orléanais, 120 kilomètres south-south-west of Paris, it is bordered by the forêt d'Orléans and by the Sologne region to the south.

The town is crossed by the Canal d'Orléans, which connects to the Canal du Loing and the Canal de Briare at Buges near Montargis.

Climate
Orléans experiences an oceanic climate (Köppen climate classification Cfb), similar to much of central France.

See also
 Communes of the Loiret department
 Canal d'Orléans

References

Fayauxloges